Reguiba is a town and commune, and capital of Reguiba District, in El Oued Province, Algeria. According to the 2008 census it has a population of 40,367, up from 30,392 in 1998, and an annual growth rate of 2.9%.

Climate

Reguiba has a hot desert climate (Köppen climate classification BWh), with very hot summers and mild winters, and very little precipitation throughout the year.

Transportation
Local roads connect the town to the N48 highway, including one that joins at Guemar, leading south to the provincial capital El Oued and north to Still, and Biskra via the N3 highway.

Education

3.6% of the population has a tertiary education, and another 12.3% has completed secondary education. The overall literacy rate is 72.3%, and is 78.9% among males and 65.6% among females.

Localities
The commune of Reguiba is composed of 15 localities:

Reguiba
Hobba
Debaïa
Khobna
Nezla
Cherguia
Aouaïssa
El Arfji
Nador
Djaïkh
Ouaziten
Halk Louad
Bir Bachir
Guerraïna
Sif El Menadi

References

Neighbouring towns and cities

Communes of El Oued Province
Cities in Algeria
Algeria